Friedrich Philipp Dulk (22 November 1788 in Stallupönen – 14 December 1851 in Königsberg) was a German pharmacist and chemist. He was the father of writer Albert Dulk (1819–1884) and father-in-law to mathematician Otto Hesse.

He studied law at the University of Königsberg, and in the meantime received training in pharmacy from his brother. In 1812 he qualified as a pharmacist in Berlin, and three years later, took charge of his brother's pharmacy. In 1825 he obtained his habilitation and in 1833 became a full professor of chemistry at the University of Königsberg. In 1847 he was elected a delegate to the Prussian Landtag.

Published works 
In 1829–30 he published a two-volume Prussian pharmacopeia titled "Pharmacopoea Borussica : die Preussiche Pharmacopoe" (volume 1; volume 2). His other written works include:
 Über Elektromagnetismus, 1823 – On electromagnetism.
 Einfache Mittel, 1829.
 Zusammengesetzte Mittel, 1830.
 Anhang zur Preussischen Pharmakopöe, 1830 – Notes on the Prussian pharmacopoeia. 
 Handbuch der Chemie (2 volumes, 1833–34) – Handbook of chemistry.
 Synoptische Tabelle über die Atomgewichte der einfachen und mehrerer zusammengesetzter Körper und über das Verhältniß der Bestandtheile der letzteren (4th edition, 1839) – Synoptic table of atomic weights of simple and more composite bodies, etc.

References 

1788 births
1851 deaths
People from Nesterov
People from East Prussia
Academic staff of the University of Königsberg
University of Königsberg alumni 
German pharmacists
19th-century German chemists